Rajgir Assembly constituency is one of 243 constituencies of legislative assembly of Bihar.  It is a part of Nalanda Lok Sabha constituency along with other assembly constituencies viz. Islampur, Harnaut, Hilsa, Nalanda, Asthawan and Biharsharif.

Overview
Rajgir comprises CD Block Giriyak; Gram Panchayat Nai Pokhar & Rajgir (NA) of Rajgir CD Block; Gram Panchayats Gorawan, Mahuri, Kul Fatehpur, Sabait, Dharhara, Nanand, Karianna, Ghostawan, Barakar, Pawadih, Gorma & Silao (NA) of Silao CD Block; Gram Panchayats Sakraul, Korai, Tungi, Muraura, Mahamadpur Nakatpura, Tiuri, Chhabilapur, Pawa, Hargawan, Singthu, Palatpura, Tetrawan, Paroha & Sarbahadi of Bihar CD Block.

Members of Legislative Assembly

Elections

2020

See also 

 List of Assembly constituencies of Bihar
 Rajgir

Sources
Bihar Assembly Election Results in 1951
Bihar Assembly Election Results in 1957
Bihar Assembly Election Results in 1962
Bihar Assembly Election Results in 1967
Bihar Assembly Election Results in 1969
Bihar Assembly Election Results in 1972
Bihar Assembly Election Results in 1977
Bihar Assembly Election Results in 1980
Bihar Assembly Election Results in 1985
Bihar Assembly Election Results in 1990
Bihar Assembly Election Results in 1995
Bihar Assembly Election Results in 2000

References

External links
 

Politics of Nalanda district
Assembly constituencies of Bihar